Ariyanayagiamman Temple  is situated at Keezhanilaikkottai in Tirumayam taluk in Pudukkottai district in Tamil Nadu, India.

Location
It is located at a distance of 14 km in Arantangi-Pudukkottai road.

Presiding deity
The presiding deity is known as Ariyanayagiamman.

Speciality
The deity is considered as the clan deity of the village. During the last Tuesday of the Tamil month of Aadi, 'Madhu Eduppu Thiruvizha', bringing liquor in pots by the devotees and offering them to the deity took place.

Worshipping time
Pujas are held four times daily at Kalasanthi (8.00 a.m.), Uttchikkalam (noon 12.00), Sayaratchai (5.30 p.m.) and Arthajamam (8.00 p.m.). The temple is opened for worship from 6.00 a.m. to 12.30 p.m. and from 4.30 p.m. to 8.30 p.m. During the Tamil month of Ani 11 day festival is held and during Purattasi nine day navaratri festival is held. On the 11th day of Ani festival, the processional deity of the Amman comes around the temple.

References

 Hindu temples in Pudukkottai district